Brian Patrick Kelly (born January 14, 1976) is a former American football cornerback in the National Football League (NFL). He was drafted by the Tampa Bay Buccaneers in the second round of the 1998 NFL Draft. He played college football at the University of Southern California.

Kelly earned a Super Bowl ring with the Buccaneers in Super Bowl XXXVII. He also played for the Detroit Lions.

High school career
Kelly is a high school graduate from Overland High School in Aurora, Colorado.  Overland won the 1993 6A state championship in his senior year.

College career
Kelly graduated from the University of Southern California in 1997.

Professional career

Tampa Bay Buccaneers
Kelly was drafted by the Tampa Bay Buccaneers in the 2nd round of the 1998 NFL Draft. In 2002, he helped the Bucs win the Super Bowl, during that same season he had 8 interceptions, which tied for the league lead along with Rod Woodson. On February 15, 2008, he exercised a buyout option in his contract and became a free agent.

Detroit Lions
On March 8, 2008, he signed a three-year deal with the Detroit Lions. He appeared in 11 games (all starts) for the Lions in 2008, recording 26 tackles and a pass defensed. The team released him on December 9 after signing cornerback Dexter Wynn.

NFL statistics

References

1976 births
Living people
American football cornerbacks
Detroit Lions players
Players of American football from Nevada
Sportspeople from the Las Vegas Valley
Tampa Bay Buccaneers players
USC Trojans football players